Caribbean people are the people born in or inhabitants of the Caribbean region or people of Caribbean descent living outside the Caribbean. The Caribbean region was initially populated by Amerindians from several different Kalinago and Taino groups. These groups were decimated by a combination of enslavement and disease brought by European colonizers. Descendants of the Taino and Kalinago tribes exist today in the Caribbean and elsewhere but are usually of partial Amerindian ancestry.

Modern Caribbean people usually further identify by their own specific ethnic ancestry, therefore constituting various subgroups, of which are: Afro-Caribbean (largely descendants of bonded African slaves), Hispanic/Latino-Caribbean (people from the Spanish-speaking Caribbean who descend from solely or a mixture of Spaniards, West Africans, indigenous peoples, other Europeans, Arabs, or Chinese), Indo-Caribbean (largely descendants of Indian jahaji indentured laborers and some free immigrants), White Caribbean (largely descendants of European colonizers and some indentured workers), Chinese Caribbeans (largely descendants of free Chinese immigrants and some indentured workers), and Indigenous Caribbeans (descendants of the indigenous people of the Caribbean with some degree of admixture).

Culture

 List of Caribbean music genres

See also

 Afro-Caribbean
 British African-Caribbean people
 Indigenous peoples of the Caribbean
 Caribbean region of Colombia
 Indo-Caribbean
 Asian Caribbean
 White Caribbean
 West Indian

References

External links